Adam James (born 9 September 1972) is an English actor.

Early life
James was born in London on 9 September 1972.

James's godfather was Jon Pertwee. He trained at the Guildhall School of Music and Drama where he was a contemporary of Dominic West and Daniel Evans and graduated in 1996. In September 2015, he married actress and psychotherapist Victoria Shalet. Their first child was born in September 2016, and he has a daughter from a previous relationship, Daisy.

Career
His credits include Band of Brothers, The Mother of Tears, Ancient Rome: The Rise and Fall of an Empire, Bonekickers, Henry VIII: The Mind of a Tyrant and a long running storyline in Casualty, as well as an episode of ITV2 drama Secret Diary of a Call Girl. He appeared in Extras, as the new agent of Ricky Gervais's character. He has also appeared in Ashes to Ashes as Edward Markham in the first episode.

In 2009, James appeared in the Doctor Who episode "Planet of the Dead", co-starring with David Tennant, the pair having first worked together in Manchester's Royal Exchange Theatre 1999 production of King Lear. James's other theatre work includes Blood and Gifts (2010) and Much Ado About Nothing (2011), alongside David Tennant and Catherine Tate. He has recently appeared in a few rehearsed readings at the Royal Court and Finborough Theatre.

He portrayed Monsieur de Barra in the feature film A Little Chaos and portrayed Jeremy Heywood in Coalition, a Channel 4 drama about the 2010 election. In November 2015, he reprised his role as Prime Minister Mr Evans in King Charles III on Broadway, New York. In 2016, he portrayed Hovstad in An Enemy of the People at Chichester Festival Theatre.

Filmography

Television

Film

Theatre

Radio

Misc

References

External links

Profile – National Theatre

1972 births
Living people
20th-century British male actors
21st-century British male actors
Alumni of the Guildhall School of Music and Drama
British male film actors
British male radio actors
British male stage actors
British male television actors
British male voice actors
Male actors from London